Robert Brookson (15 April 1939 – 31 March 1993) was a Canadian rower. He competed in the men's coxless four event at the 1964 Summer Olympics.

References

External links
 

1939 births
1993 deaths
Canadian male rowers
Olympic rowers of Canada
Rowers at the 1964 Summer Olympics
Place of birth missing